Mike or Michael Ashley may refer to:
Mike Ashley (businessman) (born 1964), English billionaire owner of various sports-related shop chains
Mike Ashley (writer) (born 1948), British researcher and editor of science fiction and dark fantasy
Michael Ashley (astronomer), Australian astronomer, famous for his work in Antarctica